The Definitive Collection is a 2006 compilation album by Motown sensation Diana Ross.

Track listing
"I'm Coming Out" - 5:10
"Love Hangover" - 3:47
"Missing You" - 4:15
"Mirror, Mirror" - 6:06
"Touch Me in the Morning" - 3:49
"Upside Down" - 4:03
"Muscles" - 4:37
"Why Do Fools Fall in Love" - 2:53
"Reach Out and Touch (Somebody's Hand)" - 3:03
"Good Morning Heartache" - 2:20
"Last Time I Saw Him" - 2:49
"My Mistake (Was to Love You)" (with Marvin Gaye) - 2:54
"It's My Turn" - 3:55
"Ain't No Mountain High Enough" - 4:07
"The Boss" - 3:51
"Swept Away" - 5:23
"Theme from Mahogany (Do You Know Where You're Going To)" - 3:23
"Endless Love" (with Lionel Richie) - 4:26
"What a Diff'rence a Day Made" - 3:27
"Remember Me" - 3:39

References

2006 compilation albums
Motown compilation albums
Diana Ross compilation albums